Shaker is the second and final album David Johansen recorded with the Harry Smiths.  The album was released in 2002 by Chesky Records. The Harry Smiths personnel is the same as the band on the debut album, except for the drummer Keith Carlock, who replaced Joey Baron.

Shaker is currently the last album David Johansen has released as a solo artist since reuniting and returning to the New York Dolls in 2004.

Track listing
"Furry's Blues" (Furry Lewis) 
"I'll Go with Her" (Robert Wilkins) 
"Deep Blue Sea" (Tommy McClennan / Traditional) 
"My Morphine" (David Rawlings, Gillian Welch) 
"Ham Hound Crave" (Reverend Rubin Lacy)
"Let the Mermaids Flirt with Me" (Mississippi John Hurt)
"I Can't Be Satisfied" (Muddy Waters) 
"In Love Again" (Memphis Minnie) 
"Death Letter" (Son House) 
"My Grandpa Is Old Too" (Lightnin' Hopkins) 
"Jailbird Love Song"
"High Sheriff" (Charley Patton) 
"Kassie Jones" (Furry Lewis) 
"The Last Kind Words" (Geeshie Wiley)

Personnel
David Johansen - guitar, vocals, harmonica
Larry Saltzman - banjo, guitar
Kermit Driscoll - bass, didjeridu
Brian Koonin - guitar, mandolin
Keith Carlock - drums, percussion

References

External links
Chesky Records Shaker official website

2002 albums
David Johansen albums
Chesky Records albums